The Ouled Birri (spelled variously) is a Moorish tribe in the Trarza region of northern Mauritania. It is a Zawāyā tribe (religious) tribe. The Oulad Birri have produced a number of important Marabouts of the Qadiriyya Sufi tariqa: most famous among them was Shaykh Sidya Baba, who aided the Frenchman Xavier Coppolani in bringing the Mauritanian emirates under colonial rule in the first years of the 20th century. This secured French protection for Zawia tribes from extortion by warrior Hassane groupings, and a prominent position for Sidya Baba and his family in the colonial and postcolonial state.

Other members of the tribe Mauritania's first President, Moktar Ould Daddah; and his half-brother, Ahmed Ould Daddah, who was one of the main contenders in the 2007 Presidential elections in Mauritania.

The tribe generally adheres to the Maliki rite of Sunni Islam, but is associated with Qadiriyya Sufism. It has traditionally, like all Moorish tribes, upheld a nomadic or seminomadic way of life.

See also 
Moors
Sahrawi

References 

Sahrawi tribes
French West Africa
Mauritanian Moors